Craig Dugald Davidson (born 23 February 1977) is a South African former rugby union international who represented the Springboks in five Test matches.

Davidson, born in King William's Town, was educated at Durban's Northwood School.

After playing his early rugby for the Crusaders Rugby Club in Durban, Davidson debuted for the Sharks in the 1999 Currie Cup and the following year played his first Super 12 season. A scrum-half, Davidson was a Test player for the Springboks in 2002 and 2003. On debut against Wales in Cape Town he scored a late try in a 19–8 win for the Springboks. He also played two Tests against Argentina and featured twice in the 2003 Tri Nations Series.

By the time Davidson retired in 2006, due to injuries, he had earned 53 Currie Cup and 56 Super Rugby caps for the Sharks. In 2009 he was presented with the exclusive Freedom of the Park Award from the club.

See also
List of South Africa national rugby union players

References

External links

1977 births
Living people
South African rugby union players
South Africa international rugby union players
Sharks (Currie Cup) players
Sharks (rugby union) players
Sportspeople from Qonce
Rugby union players from the Eastern Cape
Rugby union scrum-halves
Alumni of Northwood School, Durban